Eneroth is a surname. People with this surname include:
Tomas Eneroth (born 1966), Swedish politician with the Social Democrats
Jonas Eneroth, Swedish video game producer

See also
Jhonas Enroth (born 1988), Swedish ice hockey goaltender in the U.S. National Hockey League